Jean III de Brosse (d. 1502) was Count of Penthièvre from 1480 until his death. He was the elder son of Jean II de Brosse and Nicole, Countess of Penthièvre.

On 15 May 1468, he married Louise de Laval, daughter of Guy XIV de Laval and Isabelle of Brittany. They had one son, René de Brosse, and four daughters.

See also
 Jean IV de Brosse

Notes

1502 deaths
Counts of Penthièvre
Year of birth unknown